Mongrain may refer to:
Bob Mongrain, Canadian hockey player
Daniel Mongrain, Canadian musician
Erik Mongrain, Canadian composer
Guy Mongrain, Canadian TV host
James Mongrain, American artist
Jeffrey Mongrain, American artist and historian
Jean-Luc Mongrain, Canadian journalist
Joseph-Alfred Mongrain, Canadian politician
Lucien Mongrain, Canadian politician